Novonadezhdinsky is a rural locality (a settlement) in Vasilyevskoye Rural Settlement, Anninsky District, Voronezh Oblast, Russia. The population was 707 as of 2010. There are 14 streets.

Geography 
Novonadezhdinsky is located 26 km west of Anna (the district's administrative centre) by road. Vasilyevka is the nearest rural locality.

References 

Rural localities in Anninsky District